Lac Beauchamp is an artificial lake located in Lac Beauchamp Park in Gatineau, Quebec, Canada.

Beauchamp
Landforms of Gatineau